The String Quintet in C minor, Op. 104, written by Ludwig van Beethoven in 1817, performed on 10 December 1818, and published in 1819, is an arrangement of the early C minor Piano Trio, Op. 1 No. 3. This work is scored for a string quintet with two violas .

The work is referenced in Vikram Seth's 1999 novel An Equal Music.

Structure

The work is structured in four movements:

 Allegro con brio (C minor) 
 Andante cantabile con Variazioni (E-flat major) 
 Minuetto. Quasi allegro (C minor, with a trio in C major) 
 Finale. Prestissimo (C minor, with a tierce de picardie)

References
Notes

Sources

External links 
  

 104
Compositions in C minor
1817 compositions